Paris 36 is a 2008 French romantic drama film directed by Christophe Barratier. This film is set in 1930s Paris.

The song "Loin de Paname" (lyrics by Frank Thomas, music by Reinhardt Wagner), sung by Nora Arnezeder, was nominated for an Oscar for Best Original Song. The film is a co-production of France, Germany, and the Czech Republic.

Plot
The stage manager of a popular music hall is charged with murder. During his confession, we see the story of the music hall and its entertainers in flashback. When the music hall closes down, a trio of unemployed friends vow to bring the business back from the dead by staging a musical they hope will be a hit. If their gamble pays off, they'll have the money to buy the theater for themselves and the power to control their own destinies.

Cast
 Gérard Jugnot as Pigoil
 Clovis Cornillac as Milou
 Kad Merad as Jacky
 Nora Arnezeder as Douce
 Pierre Richard as Monsieur TSF
 Bernard-Pierre Donnadieu as Galapiat
 Maxence Perrin as Jojo
 François Morel as Célestin
 Élisabeth Vitali as Viviane
 Christophe Kourotchkine as Lebeaupin
 Eric Naggar as Grevoul
 Eric Prat as Commissaire Tortil
 Julien Courbey as Mondain
 Philippe du Janerand as Triquet
 Stéphane Debac as The Social Services Inspector
 Marc Citti as L'inspecteur du Quai des Orfèvres

Reception
Paris 36 received mixed to positive reviews. It holds a 64% approval rating on Rotten Tomatoes based on 83 reviews, with an average score of 5.93/10. The site's consensus states: "Sweet and light, this homage to French vaudeville – and Francophilia in general – is pretty, but its air of nostalgia occasionally borders on the saccharine." On Metacritic, based on 19 critics, the film has a 40/100 rating, indicating "mixed or average" reviews.

Accolades

References

External links
 
 
 
 
 

2008 films
2000s musical comedy-drama films
French musical comedy-drama films
German musical comedy-drama films
2000s French-language films
Films set in Paris
Films set in the 1930s
Films shot in the Czech Republic
Czech musical comedy-drama films
Films directed by Christophe Barratier
Films produced by Jacques Perrin
2008 comedy films
2008 drama films
Sony Pictures Classics films
2000s French films
2000s German films